In plants, the PIN proteins are integral membrane proteins that transport the anionic form of the phytohormone auxin across membranes. Most of the PIN proteins (e.g. PIN1/2/3/4/7 in the model plant Arabidopsis thaliana) localize at the plasma membrane (PM) where they serve as secondary active transporters involved in the efflux of auxin. The PM-localized PIN proteins show asymmetrical localisations on the membrane and are therefore responsible for polar auxin transport. Some other members of the PIN family (e.g. PIN5 and 8 in Arabidopsis) localize mostly at the ER-membrane or have a dual PM and ER localisation (e.g. PIN6 in Arabidopsis). These PIN proteins regulate the partitioning of auxin within the cell.

The PM-localized PIN proteins physically interact with a few members of the large PGP family of transporters that also work as auxin efflux carriers (PGP1 and PGP19 in Arabidopsis). These interactions result in a synergistic increase in auxin efflux.

The activity and localization of the PM-localized PIN proteins is regulated by several phosphorylations on their large cytosolic hydrophilic loop carried out by kinases of the AGC family (e.g. PID, WAG1, WAG2, PID2 in Arabidopsis) and the D6PK kinase.

References

See also
Polar auxin transport
Auxins

Plant proteins